F1 World Grand Prix 2000 (also known as simply F1 World Grand Prix) is a racing video game developed by Eutechnyx. It is based on the 2000 season of the Formula One World Championship. It is the sequel to the F-1 World Grand Prix II, both published by Eidos Interactive and Video System. As an officially licensed title, it includes all the teams, drivers and tracks from the 2000 Formula One season. The game features two distinct racing modes, arcade and simulation; the arcade mode following the style of an actual arcade machine, with loud music and commentary, whilst the simulation mode taking a more relaxed and realistic take on the genre.

References 

2001 video games
Eidos Interactive games
Formula One video games
PlayStation (console) games
Racing video games
Video games developed in the United Kingdom
Video games set in Australia
Video games set in Austria
Video games set in Brazil
Video games set in Belgium
Video games set in Canada
Video games set in France
Video games set in Germany
Video games set in Hungary
Video games set in Indiana
Video games set in Italy
Video games set in Japan
Video games set in Malaysia
Video games set in Monaco
Video games set in Spain
Video games set in the United Kingdom
Video System games
Windows games